The following are reportedly haunted locations in California, in the United States. This list is sorted by county.

Butte County
 The local Bangor fire-station 55 was allegedly haunted for several years by a wailing spirit. In 2009 the station was torn down, releasing the spirit which according to legend can still be heard echoing through the hills to this day.

Los Angeles County
 The Hollywood Sign in the Hollywood Hills neighborhood of Los Angeles is reported by believers to be haunted by the ghost of actress Peg Entwistle, who committed suicide by jumping off the "H" letter of the sign, out of grief and intoxication.
 The Lincoln Heights Jail in the Lincoln Heights neighborhood of Los Angeles is allegedly haunted by the seven inmates who were beaten by guards on what is known today as Bloody Christmas.
 The RMS Queen Mary is a retired British ocean liner permanently moored in the harbor of Long Beach that offers ghost tours for its supposed hauntings.
 The Vogue Theater projection room is said to be haunted by a ghost named "Fritz" who was a former projectionist at the Vogue Theater.
The Viper Room is a famous nightclub in Sunset Strip, West Hollywood, the club was claimed to be haunted after the incident that caused the death of actor River Phoenix in 1993. Claims include the disappearance of its ex-owner and bad luck among club goers.
 The Cecil Hotel is said to be the most haunted hotel in the county. The hotel is known for hosting many murders, suicide, and other unnatural deaths. The latest death in the hotel was the death of Canadian student Elisa Lam in 2013.

Marin County 

 Camp Bothin was an old tuberculosis hospital and an Indian residence before it was made into a Girl Scout camp. It is said you can see the ghost of a nurse pushing a cart down the halls, patients who died there moaning, and even Native American Spirits.

Monterey County
 Restaurant 1833 in Monterey takes its name from the year the building was built. Previously it was Stokes Bar & Restaurant, named for proprietor James Stokes, an English sailor who masqueraded as a physician. He committed suicide after his sons caught him in flagrante with his daughter and now haunts his former bar, along with Hattie Gragg, a later tenant of the place. Patrons reportedly hear an unseen person whisper, "Excuse me, can you help me?"

Orange County
 El Adobe de Capistrano Restaurant in San Juan Capistrano, which comprises the home of Miguel Yorba built in 1797 and the town's Juzgado (court and jail) built in 1812, is reported to house a ghost in former jail cell, now the restaurant's wine cellar.  In addition there have been reports of a headless friar in front of the restaurant.

 Black Star Canyon, in the Santa Ana Mountains above Irvine, was the site of an Indian massacre in 1831, a murder in 1899, and a fatal road accident in the 1970s. It is reportedly the site of various cult activities, cryptid sightings, and paranormal events, and is frequented by ghost hunters. It is said to be haunted by the ghosts of Spanish conquistadors (taking the form of black penguin-like apparitions) and a primate-like cryptid known as "Black Star Sam".

San Diego County

 The Hotel del Coronado, Coronado, California was completed in 1888, and its best-known ghost story centers around a woman named Kate Morgan who checked into the hotel days before her suicide in 1892. In the 1980s, a San Diego historian identified Kate Morgan as the hotel's Victorian Lady in Black ghost. After Morgan became the hotel's most famous ghost, the details surrounding the real Morgan's mysterious death became the subject of many conspiracies and ghostlore that continue to this day. But Kate Morgan may not be the only alleged ghost haunting the grand, Victorian hotel as there are over 30 documented deaths at the hotel from 1890 to 1980. 
 The Whaley House in San Diego was built by the Thomas Whaley family in 1857. The home once hosted the town courthouse, general store, granary, theater, and morgue. It evolved into a commercial hub of early San Diego, before "New Town" was developed several miles to the south. This National Historic Landmark, now a museum, is allegedly haunted by members of the Whaley family as well as a man who was hanged on the spot before the house was built. It has been called "the most haunted house in America" by Life Magazine.
 Near the Whaley House is the Cosmopolitan Hotel and Restaurant, also known for at least one ghost in residence, the daughter of its original owner Juan Bandini. Reports also claim hauntings by a wandering cat and Lady in Red.
 Rancho Buena Vista Adobe, a historic rancho in Vista dating from 1852, has been reported to be one of the most active paranormal locations in San Diego North County.
 The Avo Playhouse, a 1948 cinema in Vista converted to a playhouse, where apparitions, mysterious footsteps and cold drafts have been reported since the 1990s.
 The Escondido Public Library, a 40,000-square-foot, two-story library opened in 1980 in Escondido, where employees and volunteers have reported disembodied voices, unexplained equipment malfunctions, cold spots and sightings.
 The San Pasqual Battlefield State Historic Park, site of the 1846 Battle of San Pasqual, the bloodiest battle in California during the Mexican–American War. Witnesses have reported seeing ghostly soldiers in uniform on horseback, and heard voices, including one who mentioned Andres Pico, the leader of the Californios.
 The Julian Gold Rush Hotel and the Pioneer Cemetery in Julian, have reported sightings of ghosts from the town's Gold Rush era. 
 Employees of the Del Mar Fairgrounds have reported seeing floating apparitions on the top floor of the grandstand, and a paranormal research group recorded a figure moving through the room.

San Francisco 
 The Queen Anne Hotel in San Francisco is a historic hotel in Pacific Heights. The Hotel used to be a girls boarding school in the 1800s. The headmaster, Mary Lake, is believed to still haunt the hotel.
The Hotel Union, particularly room 207, has been reported to be haunted 
Alcatraz Island and Alcatraz Federal Penitentiary are rumored to be haunted by some of the 1,576 inmates that lived there, and before that Miwok Indians believed that evil spirits inhabited the island. 
Golden Gate Bridge, Over 1000 people have committed suicide by jumping off the Bridge, resulting in claims of it being haunted.
Chambers Mansion was owned by a wealthy businessman named Robert Craig Chambers. The story goes, after Chambers passed away, two of his nieces inherited the home. One of the nieces, Claudia Chambers, was cut in half by farming equipment. The spirit of Claudia Chambers has been reported to look out windows along with turning the lights on and off at a rapid pace.

Santa Clara County
 In Sunnyvale, Toys "R" Us employees have claimed seeing unusual rearranging of toys in the aisles, and reported sightings of a man in his thirties dressed in old clothing. Most customers are completely unaware of this legend. The Toys "R" Us was closed in 2018, and in 2021 the building is now run by REI.

The Winchester Mystery House in San Jose is supposedly haunted by the ghost of its eccentric builder, Sarah Winchester. She is said to have built the rambling mansion to protect her from the spirits of all those killed with her late husband's famous line of rifles.

Santa Barbara County 

 The La Purisima Mission is haunted by ghosts of the Chumash Tribe who died from diseases that were brought by the Spaniards. People at the mission report eerie whispers, indistinct shapes, cold drafts, and more paranormal activity, including a Spirit Soldier. It was also included in the paranormal show Scariest Places on Earth.

Ventura County

 The Glen Tavern Inn is a historic 1911 Arts and Crafts hotel in Santa Paula, that is haunted by the ghosts of children and adults from the 1910s and 1920s era. The inn is believed to be one of the most actively haunted buildings in the county despite a number of urban legends attached to the hotel.

See also
Reportedly haunted locations in the San Francisco Bay Area
List of reportedly haunted locations in the United States

References

 
California, Reportedly haunted locations in